Voices of Animals and Men is the first full-length album by The Young Knives, released on 21 August 2006. The album's title is a reference to the Adam and the Ants song "Animals and Men", which is in turn a reference to the Futurists. The cover features a figure made of straw, a reference to the Whittlesey Straw Bear Festival.

The album was nominated for the 2007 Mercury Music Prize.

Track listing
 "Part Timer" – 2:54
 "The Decision" – 3:23
 "Weekends and Bleak Days (Hot Summer)" – 2:47
 "In the Pink" – 3:16
 "Mystic Energy" – 2:52
 "Here Comes the Rumour Mill" – 3:34
 "Tailors" – 4:11
 "Half Timer" – 1:39
 "She's Attracted To" – 3:06
 "Dialing Darling" – 2:59
 "Another Hollow Line" – 3:42
 "Coastguard" – 3:01
 "Loughborough Suicide" – 3:56
 "Tremblings of Trails" – 3:21

Charts

Album

Singles
The band's first single, "The Decision", was included on the album. It was originally released on 21 November 2005 and did not chart. However, it was reissued on 30 October 2006 (with "Brochures" on the B-side instead of "Big Red Rope", which was on the original single) and reached a peak position of no. 60 on the UK Singles Chart.

Special editions

Bonus DVD 
 Live performances:
 "Kramer vs Kramer"
 "Kitchener"
 "She's Attracted To"
 "Another Hollow Line"
 "Weekends And Bleak Days"
 Videos:
 "The Decision"
 "Here Comes The Rumour Mill"
 "She's Attracted To"
 "Weekends And Bleak Days"
 Band videos:
 "Weekends And Bleak Days" (Original Video)
 "We Are The Also Rans" (Band Video)
 "She's Attracted To" (Acoustic)
 "Another Hollow Line" (Morris Dancer's Edit)
 "Part Timer" (Short Film)

Notes

2006 albums
Young Knives albums
Transgressive Records albums
Albums produced by Andy Gill